Rogart (meaning "great enclosed field") is a small village in Sutherland, Highland, Scotland. The  village was the home of  Major Andrew MacDonald, who fought in the French and Indian War.

It was originally a scattered crofting village, until the opening of the Rogart railway station at Pittentrail  to the southeast. A newer industrial village grew after the arrival of the railway in 1886, with the older village remaining.

References

Populated places in Sutherland